Robert Joshua Luck (born March 17, 1979) is an American lawyer and jurist who serves as a United States circuit judge of the United States Court of Appeals for the Eleventh Circuit and was formerly a justice of the Florida Supreme Court. A Miami native, he has previously served as an Assistant United States Attorney and as a judge on the Eleventh Judicial Circuit Court of Florida and then the Florida Third District Court of Appeal.

Background 

Luck was born on March 17, 1979, to a Jewish family in South Miami, Florida. He grew up in North Miami Beach. After high school, Luck studied economics at the University of Florida, graduating in 2000 with a Bachelor of Arts degree with highest honors. He worked as a legislative correspondent for U.S. senators Paul Coverdell and Jon Kyl from 2000 to 2001, then attended the University of Florida's Fredric G. Levin College of Law, where he was editor-in-chief of the Florida Law Review. He graduated in 2004 with a Juris Doctor magna cum laude and Order of the Coif membership.

Luck was a law clerk for judge Edward Earl Carnes of the Eleventh Circuit from 2004 to 2005. He spent a year in private practice at the law firm Greenberg Traurig, then returned to Carnes's chambers to work as a staff attorney and law clerk from 2006 to 2008. In 2008, he returned to Miami as an Assistant United States Attorney for the Southern District of Florida.

Judicial career

State judicial service 

He was appointed to the Eleventh Judicial Circuit Court of Florida in June 2013 by Rick Scott. He was later appointed to the Florida Third District Court of Appeal in March 2017, where he served as a judge.

On January 14, 2019, Governor Ron DeSantis selected Luck to be a Justice on the Supreme Court of Florida. He resigned from the court after being appointed to the Eleventh Circuit.

Federal judicial service 

On September 12, 2019, President Donald Trump announced his intent to nominate Luck to a seat on the United States Court of Appeals for the Eleventh Circuit. On October 15, 2019, his nomination was sent to the Senate. President Trump nominated Luck to the seat being vacated by Judge Gerald Bard Tjoflat, who had previously announced his intention to assume senior status on a date to be determined. Luck was unanimously rated well-qualified by the American Bar Association for the appellate position. On October 16, 2019, a hearing on his nomination was held before the Senate Judiciary Committee. On November 7, 2019, his nomination was reported out of committee by a 16–6 vote. On November 18, 2019, the Senate invoked cloture by a 61–30 vote. On November 19, 2019, the Senate confirmed his nomination by a 64–31 vote. He received his judicial commission the same day.

See also
 List of Jewish American jurists

References

External links 
 

|-

|-

1979 births
Living people
21st-century American lawyers
21st-century American judges
Assistant United States Attorneys
Federalist Society members
Florida lawyers
Justices of the Florida Supreme Court
Fredric G. Levin College of Law alumni
Judges of the Florida District Courts of Appeal
Judges of the United States Court of Appeals for the Eleventh Circuit
People from South Miami, Florida
United States court of appeals judges appointed by Donald Trump
University of Florida alumni